Unqua was a Long Island Rail Road station located along the Montauk Branch in East Massapequa, New York and first appeared on employee timetables around 1880 and listed as a flag stop station after. It was located between the Massapequa and Amityville stations just east of Unqua Creek, and served a Brooklyn Water Supply pumping station. It seemed to disappear from issued timetables around 1881 or 1882. Freight service at the station however, appears to have existed as recently as 1893.

References

External links
Unqua Station History (Arrt's Arrchives)

Former Long Island Rail Road stations in Nassau County, New York

Railway stations in the United States opened in 1880
1880 establishments in New York (state)
Railway stations closed in 1882